José Manuel Catalá Mazuecos (born 1 January 1985) is a Spanish footballer who plays for CD Gerena as a central defender or a left back.

Club career
Born in Villajoyosa, Province of Alicante, Valencian Community, Catalá emerged through local club Valencia CF's youth ranks, making his senior debut in Segunda División B where he successively represented Villajoyosa CF, Valencia CF Mestalla and Alicante CF. He helped the latter promote to Segunda División, in 2008.

After suffering immediate relegation with Alicante, Catalá continued in that level with Villarreal CF's reserves. He was instrumental as they avoided relegation in their first-ever year in the competition, totalling 2,444 minutes of action and scoring once.

Catalá was promoted to the first team for the 2010–11 season, aged already 25. He managed to provide stiff competition to veteran Joan Capdevila, inclusively relegating the European and World Champion to the bench in some games. He finished his first year in La Liga with 30 competitive matches to his credit – 16 in the league, five in the Copa del Rey and nine in a semi-final run in the UEFA Europa League– opening the score on 3 January 2011 in a 2–0 home win against UD Almería as the side eventually finished fourth and qualified to the UEFA Champions League.

After leaving the Yellow Submarine, Catalá totalled just 27 appearances in two seasons for Real Murcia and Apollon Limassol, the latter in the Cypriot First Division. On 8 August 2014 he changed teams and countries again, joining Veria F.C. of the Super League Greece.

Catalá made his debut for his new team on 24 August 2014, coming on as a late substitute in a 3–2 home victory over Skoda Xanthi FC. His first start occurred against Ergotelis FC, his two mistakes resulting in both of the opposition's goals in an eventual 2–2 away draw. After failing to perform overall, player and club agreed to mutually terminate the contract on 26 May 2015.

In the following years, Catalá played in the Spanish third division.

Club statistics

References

External links

1985 births
Living people
People from Villajoyosa
Sportspeople from the Province of Alicante
Spanish footballers
Footballers from the Valencian Community
Association football defenders
La Liga players
Segunda División players
Segunda División B players
Tercera División players
Valencia CF Mestalla footballers
Villajoyosa CF footballers
Alicante CF footballers
Villarreal CF B players
Villarreal CF players
Real Murcia players
Racing de Ferrol footballers
SD Ejea players
FC Jumilla players
CD Gerena players
Cypriot First Division players
Apollon Limassol FC players
Super League Greece players
Veria F.C. players
Spanish expatriate footballers
Expatriate footballers in Cyprus
Expatriate footballers in Greece
Spanish expatriate sportspeople in Cyprus
Spanish expatriate sportspeople in Greece